The International Federation of Chemical, Energy, Mine and General Workers' Unions (ICEM) was a global union federation of trade unions. As of November 2007, ICEM represented 467 industrial trade unions in 132 countries, claiming a membership of over 20 million workers.

History 
The federation was founded in 1995 in Washington DC when the Miners' International Federation merged with the International Federation of Chemical and General Workers' Unions.  In 2000, the small Universal Alliance of Diamond Workers merged into the federation, while in 2007, the World Federation of Industry Workers joined.  In June 2012, affiliates of ICEM merged into the new global federation IndustriALL Global Union.

The organization represented workers employed in a wide range of industries, including energy, mining, chemicals and bioscience, pulp and paper, rubber, gems and jewellery, glass, ceramics, cement, environmental services and others.

Organization and activities 
The international headquarters of ICEM was based in Brussels, Belgium, where meetings of the Presidium and the Executive Committee were held.  These governing bodies organized activities on a higher level while the regional offices organized regional conferences, workshops and solidarity actions. The Presidium oversaw the grand line of ICEM whilst the Executive Committee was more involved in the day-to-day routine of the organization. Every four years, starting in 1995, a worldwide congress was organized in which new committee members were elected and policies were changed. The congresses were held in the following order:

 Washington DC, 1995.
 Durban, South Africa, in November 1999.
 Stavanger, Norway, in August 2003.
 Bangkok, Thailand, in November 2007.

The regional offices dealt with specific geographical areas such as Africa, Asia Pacific, Europe, Latin America and the Caribbean and North America. The regional office of the Asia Pacific area was housed in Seoul, South Korea. This regional office was one of the most active offices of ICEM.

ICEM supported many strikes in various regions including the strike of 7 October 1998 in Russia by communists and the Federation of Independent Trade Unions of Russia during the 1998 Russian Financial Crisis. Affiliates of ICEM have also organized protests in South Africa. ICEM worked together with human rights and environmental activists who were in conflict with multinationals such as Rio Tinto by raising awareness and funding research.

ICEM published two quarterly bulletins called ICEM Info and ICEM Global which merged in 2002 to become ICEM Global Info.

Research 
Richard Croucher and Elizabeth Cotton's book Global Unions, Global Business contains a case study of the ICEM's dealings with the Anglo-American mining company. This is in Chapter Eight. The book is published by Middlesex University Press (2009). .

The archive of ICEM is housed in the International Institute of Social History in Amsterdam and is open to the public.

Leadership

General Secretaries
1995: Vic Thorpe
1999: Fred Higgs
2007: Manfred Warda

Presidents
1995: Hans Berger
2005: Senzeni Zokwana

References

External links

 

 
Chemical industry trade unions
Energy industry trade unions
Mining trade unions
Organisations based in Geneva
Trade unions established in 1995
Trade unions disestablished in 2012